Wattegama Central College  is public school situated in Wattegama, Kandy, Central Province, Sri Lanka.

History

Wattegama Central College was established in 19 March in 1959 as Madhdhuma Bandara College. College provide primary and secondary education for students of 1–13 grades. Currently college has enrollment of 1,500 students and about 80 teachers. 
 
College won productivity awards in 2002 and 2003.

Administration 
Principal: M.H.Wijerathne 

Educational institutions established in 1959
Schools in Kandy District
1959 establishments in Ceylon